Amila is a town and nagar panchayat in Mau district  in the state of Uttar Pradesh, India.

Demographics
At the 2001 India census, Amila had a population of 4,764. Males constituted 51% of the population and females 49%. Amila had an average literacy rate of 66%, higher than the national average of 59.5%; with 57% of the males and 43% of females literate. 16% of the population was under 6 years of age.

Language
Common spoken languages are Bhojpuri and Hindi

References

Cities and towns in Mau district